Wierda Valley is a suburb of Johannesburg, South Africa. It is named after Sytze Wierda, the first architect and engineer to the South African Republic. It is located in Region E of the City of Johannesburg Metropolitan Municipality.

References

Johannesburg Region E